Deymeh (also known as Deymeh-ye Pā’īn) is a village in Posht-e Arbaba Rural District, Alut District, Baneh County, Kurdistan Province, Iran. At the 2006 census, its population was 41, in 8 families. The village is populated by Kurds.

References 

Towns and villages in Baneh County
Kurdish settlements in Kurdistan Province